The 1975–76 New England Whalers season was the Whalers' fourth season of play in the World Hockey Association. The Whalers once again made the playoffs but fell short of winning the Avco Cup, falling in the semi-finals to the Houston Aeros.

Offseason

Regular season

Final standings

Schedule and results

Playoffs

New England Whalers 3, Cleveland Crusaders 0 – Preliminary Round

New England Whalers 4, Indianapolis Racers 3 – Division Quarterfinals

Houston Aeros 4, New England Whalers 3 – Division Semifinals

Player statistics

Awards and records

Transactions

Roster

Updated June 5, 1976.

Draft picks
New England's draft picks at the 1975 WHA Amateur Draft.

Farm teams

See also
 1975–76 WHA season

References

External links

New
New
New England Whalers seasons
New England
New England